Jake Spedding (born ) is an English professional rugby league footballer who plays  or er for the Swinton Lions in the Betfred Championship.

He previously played for St Helens in the Super League, and on loan from the Saints at the Sheffield Eagles in the Championship. Spedding has also played Barrow Raiders and Featherstone Rovers in the Championship.

Background
Spedding was born in Leeds, West Yorkshire, England.

Career
Spedding made his début in the Super League for St. Helens on 8 April 2016 against the Warrington Wolves. His first professional try came for the Sheffield Eagles in a Championship game against the Rochdale Hornets in which they won 18–42. He spent the 2017 season on loan with the side. Following this loan spell, Spedding rejoined the Eagles as part of a Dual registration deal between St Helens and Sheffield for the 2018 season. He was very impressive during his time at Sheffield and made a handful of Super League appearances at St Helens. However his loan to Barrow was less successful. In 2019 he joined Featherstone but due to impressive performances from other centres he didn't get a game. At the end of the season he joined the Widnes Vikings.

References

External links
St Helens profile
SL profile
Saints Heritage Society profile

1996 births
Living people
Barrow Raiders players
English rugby league players
Featherstone Rovers players
Rugby league players from Leeds
Rugby league wingers
Sheffield Eagles players
St Helens R.F.C. players
Swinton Lions players
Widnes Vikings players